The Princeton Nassoons are a ten to twenty-member low-voice a cappella group at Princeton University. The group has been officially self-selecting (and self-directing) since 1941, although the original group is known to have sung together as early as 1939. The Nassoons are the oldest a cappella group at Princeton University.

The Nassoons have performed at a number of prominent venues, including the White House, the US Open, and have also appeared on The Early Show, and Good Morning America. Additionally, they have performed for various heads of state, such as Queen Noor of Jordan and the royal family of Liechtenstein. They also appeared in Admission (2013 film) starring Tina Fey and Paul Rudd.

About the group 
The Nassoons consist of ten to twenty men covering all class years, from freshmen to seniors. Auditions for prospective members are held at the beginning of fall and spring semesters; however, only freshmen and sophomores can join the group. Most musical arrangements are split into five-part harmonies (First Tenor, Second Tenor, Tenor-Baritone, Baritone, Bass), and most feature at least one soloist. The group rehearses four to six nights a week in the basement of 1901 Hall (Room 100), a room that was deeded to them by the University and which they have been singing in since 1949. They perform at University functions, as well as corporate events, dinner parties, country clubs, schools, and other engagements along the eastern seaboard during the academic year. They also officially tour three times a year to both domestic and international locales.

Within the Ivy League a cappella music tradition, the Princeton Nassoons are fourth in age, following The Whiffenpoofs (est. 1909), The Spizzwinks(?) (est. 1914), and The Society of Orpheus and Bacchus (est. 1938), all of Yale University. It is the oldest such group at Princeton and an early performer in an Arch sing setting.

The Nassoons are members of Acaprez, an organization of eight Princeton University a cappella groups who organize "arch sings" and abide by regulations regarding the audition process and song ownership. The other member groups are the Tigertones, the Footnotes, the Tigerlilies, the Tigressions, the Wildcats, the Katzenjammers, and Roaring Twenty (co-ed).

History

Beginnings 

The late 1930s marked the start of the Nassoons, and the 1940s saw the group's death and rebirth due to World War II. The original eight members came out of the Glee Club to introduce small-group a cappella singing to the Princeton campus. Their founding act initiated what has become, almost seventy years later, a bona fide singing group community and subculture which involves over a hundred undergraduates and innumerable fans.

The Nassoons' popularity was swift in coming. The turning point for the yet-unnamed group came in autumn 1941. During the annual Princeton-Yale Glee Club concert on the weekend of the schools' annual football game, the eight men sang a short set in the middle of the program to a lukewarm reception. In a move of desperation, they decided to unveil an arrangement that the Glee Club director had explicitly asked them not to perform, fearing its bawdy five-part harmonies and scandalous lyrics would offend the sensibilities of the stodgy New Haven audience. But as the final chord rang out, the crowd broke into thunderous applause, and the group sang it again as an encore. That song, Perfidia, remains the alumni song of the Nassoons, and it ends their performances to this day.

A year after their debut at Yale, the Nassoons were singing in the presence of Ella Fitzgerald, and had performed in prominent venues like New York's posh Rainbow Room. By the decade's close, the group had lent their voices to the music of such 1940s luminaries as Lester Lanin and Gertrude Lawrence. In early years, the Daily Princetonian spent much ink chronicling the group, announcing new members, new officers, and the dates of the group's performances at upcoming social engagements. Though the Nassoons were still affiliated with the Glee Club and performed when it sang on campus, the group was not held back from performing on their own. Monday through Friday they practiced at one o'clock in Murray-Dodge Hall, getting ready for the growing list of shows that year. By August 1942, they had sung all over the East Coast and the South, at beach clubs, hotels, prep schools, other colleges, and even army camps, not to mention the girls' schools, where they were always warmly received.

A glowing campus news write-up bragged that the group was rapidly replacing the "decadent, timeworn" Whiffenpoofs as the premier East Coast singing group. "The Smiffenpoofs," it predicted, referring to the all-girl group at Smith College, "would soon become the 'Lassoons.'" The Nassoons certainly had enough songs in their repertoire to fill an entire program. They held a special spring concert on May 28, 1943, singing twenty-one songs on the steps of Blair Arch, foreshadowing what would become one of the long-standing traditions of campus life: an "arch sing".

In fall 1942, the Nassoons broadened their campus exposure by involving themselves with the Triangle Club. They performed in Time and Again while the sets were being changed behind the curtain, and also occasionally in the background during the bar and night club numbers. Among the songs they performed in the show were "Thank God They're Not Rationing You" and "As I Remember You."

But the celebrated life of the Nassoons came to an abrupt end in spring 1943 when, like many campus activities, the group disbanded because of World War II. Among their last achievements before disbanding was the release of their 1942 album of songs and their recording session with Gertrude Lawrence, a famed Broadway actress of the time, which was rebroadcast over the Armed Forces Network in 1943. As a symbol of their unity, the group wrote up a constitution, stating that the name "Nassoons" could not be used by any singing group on campus unless at least four of the old Nassoons came back to audition new members for the group.

In spring 1946, on the weekend of May 18, Nassoon alumni returned to campus, held auditions for new members, and revived the group after its three-year hiatus. During its first two years, the Nassoons were still connected to the Glee Club; but in September 1946, the Committee on Non-Athletic Organizations formally gave a charter to the Nassoons as an independent organization. The group, thereafter a "legal entity," was officially reborn. Practices were held in the basement of the Presbyterian Church on Nassau Street (not until 1949 did the group start using their permanent home, 100 1901 Hall).

Although also occupied with learning the old Nassoon songs, the postwar group concentrated its energy on the 1946 Triangle show, Clear the Track, the first show Triangle had performed since 1942. The Nassoons made their campus debut with the Glee Club on November 22 at Alexander Hall, and later that night sang at a dance held by the Daily Princetonian, sharing the stage with Les Brown and his orchestra (1946's "Top Recording Band of the Year").

In January 1947, the group announced their plans for a March 7 recording session to cut their first album in five years. They picked as their recording technician Mary Howard, who a month earlier had been cited by Time magazine for being at "the top of her profession." The release date was set for April 1947. Advance orders were recommended.

On November 14, 1947, the Nassoons sang with the Whiffenpoofs for the first time since the prewar disbanding. The two groups appeared together at the Prince-Tiger prom. The venue was the first held in the newly completed Dillon Gymnasium, and two thousand people were expected to attend. Through the efforts of Jim Buck '46, the two groups played their first touch-football game together on the morning of the varsity football game, an annual tradition that continues to this day.

By 1948, the group was holding weekly informal sings on Sunday afternoon in the Nassau Inn. Outside of performances were hour-and-a-half practice sessions, five times a week, when the group practiced their thirty-five to forty song repertoire and taught the arrangements to new members. Membership for prospective Nassoons was not guaranteed. These "probational" members had to shine during their first year with the group, or else they would not be officially taken into the group, and asked to leave.

Albums 
The Nassoons began recording their music as early as 1941, with a recording of The Nassoon Signature, and continued to produce LP albums from that point on, typically every two years. The group converted to the compact disc format in 1990. Albums typically contain twenty to twenty-two songs that reflect the group's current performance repertoire. All arrangements are Nassoon-specific; most are written by group members and the rest are written explicitly for the group.

Tours 

The Nassoons have a long history of domestic and international tours. The group typically tours every year during Fall Break (the last week of October), Intersession (the week between semesters, usually the last week of January), and Spring Break (varies). Recent international destinations have included Brazil, the Dominican Republic, the British Virgin Islands, Germany, Austria, Bermuda, Taiwan, Mexico, Jordan, Switzerland, and France. The Nassoons also have a long-running relationship with Omni Hotels & Resorts where they travel each Labor Day weekend. Two notable locations are Omni Mt. Washington in New Hampshire and Omni Homestead in Virginia.

Recent tours 
Fall Break 2019
 Singapore
Spring Break 2019
 Norfolk, VA
 Charleston, SC	
 Atlanta, GA
 Miami, FL
 Hilton Head, SC
 Myrtle Beach, SC

Fall Break 2018
 Los Angeles, CA		

Spring Break 2018
 Munich, Germany		

Fall Break 2017
 Dallas/Fort Worth, TX	
 Austin, TX	

Spring Break 2017
 Washington, DC	
 Hilton Head, SC
 Atlanta, GA
 Miami, FL
 Williamsburg, VA

Winter Break 2016
 Mount Washington, NH	

Fall Break 2016
 San Francisco, CA	

Spring Break 2016
 Seoul, South Korea	

Fall Break 2015
 Austin, TX	
 Dallas/Fort Worth, TX

Spring Break 2015
 Atlanta, GA	
 Miami, FL	
 Jacksonville, FL

Intersession 2015
 London, UK	

Fall Break 2014
 Los Angeles	
 San Diego, CA

Spring Break 2013
 West Palm Beach, FL

Intersession 2013
 Hong Kong

Fall Break 2013
 San Francisco, CA

Winter Break 2012
 New York, NY	
 Cambridge, MA
 Marblehead, MA
 Westport, CT

Fall Break 2012
 Los Angeles	
 San Diego, CA

Labor Day Weekend 2012
 The Greenbrier Resort, WV

Spring Break 2012
 Germany
 Switzerland
 Liechtenstein

Intersession 2012
 West Palm Beach, FL
 Sarasota, FL

Fall Break 2011
 Charlotte, NC	
 Greenville, SC	
 Atlanta, GA

Labor Day Weekend 2011
 The Greenbrier Resort, WV

Spring Break 2011
 Detroit, MI
 Ann Arbor, MI

Intersession 2011
 Tampa, FL
 Sarasota, FL
 Palm Beach, FL

Fall Break 2010
 Nice, France

Labor Day Weekend 2010
 The Greenbrier Resort, WV

Spring Break 2010
 Germany

Intersession 2010
 Cancún, México

Fall Break 2009
 Indian Rocks Beach, FL

Labor Day Weekend 2009
 The Greenbrier Resort, WV

Spring Break 2009
 Cleveland, OH
 Chicago, IL
 Pittsburgh, PA

Intersession 2009
 Rio de Janeiro, Brazil
 Buzios, Brazil

Fall Break 2008
 La Jolla, CA
 San Diego, CA
 Palm Springs, CA
 Los Angeles

Labor Day Weekend 2008
 The Greenbrier Resort, WV

Spring Break 2008
 Clearwater Beach, FL
 Tampa, FL
 Sarasota, FL

Intersession 2008
 Vienna, Austria
 Bavaria, Germany
 Frankfurt, Germany

Music 
The Nassoons perform original arrangements and completely original pieces of all musical genres from the 1940s to today. Their arrangements include music from Cole Porter, The Beach Boys, Stevie Wonder, Billy Joel, Bruno Mars, Justin Timberlake, Beyoncé, and more. They also create and perform original music, some of which, such as "Tigertown Blues" and "Princeton Is Free", has become signature music for the group.

References

External links 
 

1939 establishments in New Jersey
Collegiate a cappella groups
Musical groups established in 1939
Musical groups from New Jersey
Princeton University